Peões is a 2004 Brazilian documentary film directed by Eduardo Coutinho.

Synopsis
The documentary delves into the search for ABC region metallurgists from São Paulo who participated in the largest strikes of the 20th century. The movement changed the face of Brazilian trade unionism, provided the basis for the creation of the Workers Party (PT) and made emerge the figure of leader Luiz Inácio Lula da Silva.

Awards 
2004: Brasília Film Festival
Best Film (won)
Critics Award (Eduardo Coutinho) (won)

2005: Cinema Brazil Grand Prize
Best Documentary (Nominee)
Best Director (Eduardo Coutinho) (Nominee)

2005: São Paulo Association of Art Critics Awards
Best Film (won)

References

External links 
 

2004 films
2000s Portuguese-language films
Brazilian documentary films
Best Picture APCA Award winners
2004 documentary films